Rancho Los Feliz was a  Spanish land concession in present-day Los Angeles County, California given in 1795 by Spanish Governor Pedro Fages to José Vicente Feliz.  The land of the grant includes Los Feliz and Griffith Park, and was bounded on the east by the Los Angeles River.

History 
Given to Jose Vicente Feliz, this was one of the first land grants made in California.  Born in Sonora, Mexico, about 1741, Corporal Feliz, a veteran of the Anza Expedition of 1776, was the Spanish military leader at the Pueblo of Los Angeles.  In 1787 Governor Fages appointed Feliz as Comisionado of the Los Angeles Pueblo, giving him the powers of Mayor and Judge. For his service, Feliz was granted Rancho Los Feliz.

The grant was confirmed in 1843 by Mexican Governor Manuel Micheltorena to Maria Ygnacia Verdugo de Feliz. Maria Ygnacia Feliz was the wife of one of the sons of Anastacio María Féliz. Anastacio was probably a cousin of José Vicente Féliz.  When Maria's husband died, she petitioned for a grant in her name and in the name of her son José Antonio Féliz.  Governor Micehltorena granted it to her in 1843. She did not remarry.

With the cession of California to the United States following the Mexican–American War, the 1848 Treaty of Guadalupe Hidalgo provided that the land grants would be honored.  As required by the Land Act of 1851, a claim for Rancho Los Feliz was filed with the Public Land Commission in 1852, and the grant was patented to Maria Ygnacia Verdugo de Feliz in 1871.

In 1863, lawyer Antonio F. Coronel acquired ownership of Rancho Los Feliz from the heirs of Maria Ygnacia Verdugo de Feliz.  Coronel sold Rancho Los Feliz to James Lick, a wealthy businessman from San Francisco. Lick died in 1876.

In 1882, Colonel Griffith Jenkins Griffith acquired  of Rancho Los Feliz. Colonel Griffith donated to the city of Los Angeles  (nearly half of the original rancho), which became Griffith Park, one of the largest city-owned parks in the country.  At the time, the Lick estate still owned the southwest portion of the rancho, and there developed the Lick Tract, which later became a part of Hollywood.

Historic sites of the Rancho
 Los Feliz Adobe.  An old adobe house built in the 1830s by heirs of Feliz still stands in Griffith Park (Park Ranger's Headquarters).
 Maugna, site of former Native American Tongva ranchería settlement preceding the Mexican rancho.

See also
Ranchos of California
List of Ranchos of California

References

External links
Map of old Spanish and Mexican ranchos in Los Angeles County

Feliz, Los
Los Feliz
Griffith Park
History of Hollywood, Los Angeles
Los Feliz, Los Angeles
1795 in Alta California
1795 establishments in Alta California
18th century in Los Angeles
19th century in Los Angeles